The Wakhan Corridor is a narrow strip of territory in Badakhshan Province of Afghanistan, extending to Xinjiang in China and separating the Gorno-Badakhshan Autonomous Region of Tajikistan from the Gilgit-Baltistan region of Pakistan. From this high mountain valley the Panj and Pamir rivers emerge and form the bigger Amu River. A trade route through the valley has been used by travellers going to and from East, South and Central Asia since antiquity.

The corridor was formed after an 1893 agreement between Mortimer Durand of British Raj and Emir Abdur Rahman Khan of Afghanistan, creating the Durand Line. This narrow strip acted as a buffer zone between the Russian Empire and the British Empire (the regions of Russian Turkestan, now in Tajikistan, and the part of British India now in Pakistan and the contested region of Gilgit-Baltistan). Its eastern end bordered China's Xinjiang region, then claimed by the Qing dynasty.

The corridor is in the Wakhan District of Afghanistan's Badakhshan Province. As of 2020, it has 17,167 residents. The northern part of the Wakhan, populated by the Wakhi and Pamiri people, is also referred to as the Pamir. The closest major airport for the residents to use is Fayzabad Airport in the city of Fayzabad to the west, which can be reached by a road network.

Geography

At its eastern end, the corridor forks into two prongs that wrap around a salient of Chinese territory, forming the  boundary between the two countries. On the Chinese side of the border is the Tashkurgan Tajik Autonomous County of Xinjiang Uyghur Autonomous Region.

The northern border of the corridor is formed by the Pamir River and Lake Zorkul in the west and the high peaks of the Pamir Mountains in the east. To the north is Tajikistan's Gorno-Badakhshan Autonomous region. To the south, the corridor is bounded by the high mountains of the Hindu Kush and Karakoram. Along the southern flank of the corridor, there are two mountain passes that connect the corridor to its neighbours. The Broghol pass offers access to the Khyber Pakhtunkhwa region of Pakistan, while the Irshad Pass connects the corridor to Gilgit-Baltistan. The Dilisang Pass, which also connects to Gilgit-Baltistan, is disused. The easternmost pass, as indicated above, is the Wakhjir Pass, which connects to China and is the only border connection between that country and Afghanistan.

The Wakhjir River emerges from an ice cave on the Afghan side of the Wakhjir Pass and flows west, joining the Bozai Darya near the village of Bozai Gumbaz to form the Wakhan River. The Wakhan River then joins the Pamir River near Kala-i-Panj to form the Panj River, which then flows out of the Wakhan Corridor at Ishkashim.

The Chinese consider Chalachigu Valley, the valley east of Wakhjir Pass on the Chinese side connecting Taghdumbash Pamir, to be part of the Wakhan Corridor. This entire valley on the Chinese side is closed to visitors; however, local residents and herders from the area are permitted access.

History
Although the terrain is extremely rugged, the Corridor was historically used as a trading route between Badakhshan and Yarkand. It appears that Marco Polo came this way. The Portuguese Jesuit priest Bento de Goes crossed from the Wakhan to China between 1602 and 1606. In May 1906, Sir Aurel Stein explored the Wakhan and reported that at that time, 100 pony loads of goods crossed annually to China. There were further crossings in 1874 by Captain T.E. Gordon of the British Army, in 1891 by Francis Younghusband, and in 1894 by Lord Curzon.

Early travellers used one of three routes:
 A northern route led up the valley of the Pamir River to Zorkul Lake, then east through the mountains to the valley of the Bartang River, then across the Sarikol Range to China.
 A southern route led up the valley of the Wakhan River to the Wakhjir Pass to China. This pass is closed for at least five months a year and is only open irregularly for the remainder.
 A central route branched off the southern route through the Little Pamir to the Murghab River valley.

From a non-Afghan point of view, the corridor is in part a political creation from The Great Game between British India and Russian Empire. In the north, an agreement between the empires in 1873 effectively split the historic region of Wakhan by making the Panj and Pamir Rivers the border between Afghanistan and the then-Russian Empire. In the south, the Durand Line Agreement of 1893 marked the boundary between British India and Afghanistan. This left a narrow strip of land ruled by Afghanistan as a buffer between the two empires, which became known as the Wakhan Corridor in the 20th century.

The corridor has been closed to regular traffic for over a century and there is no modern road. There is a rough road from Ishkashim to Sarhad-e Broghil built in the 1960s, but only rough paths beyond.

Jacob Townsend has speculated on the possibility of drug smuggling from Afghanistan to China via the Wakhan Corridor and Wakhjir Pass, but concluded that due to the difficulties of travel and border crossings, it would be minor compared to that conducted via Tajikistan's Gorno-Badakhshan Autonomous Province or through Pakistan, both having much more accessible routes into China.

The remoteness of the region has meant that, despite the long-running wars of Afghanistan since the late 1970s, the region has remained virtually untouched by conflict and many locals, who are mostly composed of ethnic Pamir and Kyrgyz, are not aware of wars in the country.

The Islamic Republic of Afghanistan asked the People's Republic of China on several occasions to open the border in the Wakhan Corridor for economic reasons or as an alternative supply route for fighting the Taliban insurgency. The Chinese resisted, largely due to unrest in its far western province of Xinjiang, which borders the corridor. , it was reported that the United States had asked China to open the corridor.

In July 2021, the area came under Taliban control for the first time during the group's summer offensive. It was reported that hundreds of ethnic Kyrgyz nomads along with their livestock attempted to flee north into Tajikistan. It is patrolled by forces of the Islamic Emirate of Afghanistan, which took over responsibility from the previous NATO-trained Afghan National Security Forces.

See also
 Wakhan
 Little Pamir
 Great Pamir
 Durand Line
 Mount Imeon

References 
Citations

Sources

External links

 (Radio Television Afghanistan (RTA Pashto))
 (RTA Dari)

 Stranded on the Roof of the World 2013 National Geographic Magazine article
 A Short Walk in the Wakhan Corridor, article by Mark Jenkins in the November 2005 issue of Outside magazine
 Wakhan & the Afghan Pamir - In the footsteps of Marco Polo - Brochure of the region by Aga Khan Foundation

Geography of Afghanistan
Sites along the Silk Road
Wakhan
Geopolitical corridors
Landforms of Badakhshan Province